Maizels, Westerberg & Co. (MW & Co.) was a leading independent investment banking firm, specialising in major corporate finance transactions in the Nordic countries. The major focus of the firm was owner driven transactions, restructurings, mergers, acquisitions and divestitures.

Overview
The firm was established by six former employees of Enskilda Secusrities: Spencer Maizels, Sten Westerberg, Mark Florman, Peter Wikström, Tomas Söderström & Jonas de Verdier. Sten Westerberg had been under-secretary of state at the Ministry of Finance (Sweden) and had strong government connections. Spencer Maizels was the company's first CEO, but died aged just 43 in 1995. He was succeeded by Mark Florman, who had been one of the driving forces behind the establishment of the firm.

History
Maizels, Westerberg & Co. was often described as a "corporate finance boutique". The term belies the position the firm had as a leading player in the Nordic mergers and acquisitions market. The Volvo/Procordia deal, which was the largest demerger in the history of Sweden, got the firm off to a running start. The emergency restructuring resulting in the sale of four subsidiaries belonging to the Swedish co-operative KF (Kooperativa Förbundet) soon followed as did a string of high-profile deals.

At the end of 1999, Maizels, Westerberg & Co. was bought by the Finnish-Swedish bank Merita Nordbanken (now Nordea). The resulting investment bank was named Maizels Merita Nordbanken and grew from 30 to 70 employees. The joint chief executives were Mark Florman and executive vice-president of Merita Nordbanken, Björn Carlsson. Nordbanken's M&A advisory team was demerged from the bank's Stockholm office and moved into Maizel's new office.

Associated Companies 
Hambro, Maizels, Westerberg & Co. Ltd. (London)
Heggeli, Maizels, Westerberg & Co. Ltd. (Oslo)

References
The Times, 20 September 1993
Acquisitions Monthly, March 1995
The Banker, April 1995
Acquisitions Monthly, August 1996
Acquisitions Monthly, August 1998
Link Magazine May 1999
The Sunday Business 20 June 1999
The Sunday Business 4 July 1999
Financial Times 15 October 1999
Financial News 25 October 1999
Acquisitions Monthly, November 1999
Acquisitions Monthly, December 1999
Corporate Money 8 December 1999
Financial News 7 February 2007
Acquisitions Monthly, August 2000
Børsen 27 November 2000

Financial services companies established in 1992
Banks of the United Kingdom
1992 establishments in the United Kingdom